is a 2000 Japanese  zombie action film directed and co-written by Ryuhei Kitamura. The film was an independent co–production between Kitamura's company Napalm Films and Wevco Production in association with KSS and Suplex. In the film, a nameless prisoner, a nameless female and her Yakuza abductors fend off zombies in a forest that resurrects the dead while the Yakuza's mysterious leader attempts to open a supernatural gate hidden within the forest and seize its dark power.

The film was originally intended as a sequel to Kitamura's short film Down to Hell but was re-developed as a new film. Principal photography was originally intended to last 3 weeks but was extended to 7 months due to weather and financial issues.

Versus premiered at the Tokyo International Fantastic Film Festival on October 29, 2000. In 2004, an expanded edition titled Ultimate Versus was released that featured 10 minutes of new footage and improved music, effects, titles, and edits.

Plot
Unknown to the world, there are 666 portals on Earth that connect this world to the other side which are concealed from human beings. However, there are some who are aware of their existence and are willing to locate and open the gates of the portals to obtain the power of darkness for their own use. Somewhere in Japan, there exists the 444th portal known as The Forest of Resurrection.

In 10th century Japan, a lone samurai fends off a horde of zombie-like samurai creatures. Though successfully vanquishing the zombies, the samurai is confronted by a mysterious priest and his league of warriors. In an attempt to take out the mysterious priest, the lone samurai charges full scale but is easily killed and defeated. However, before dying, the lone samurai spots an ally behind him, who arrives too late to save him.

In present-day Japan, two prisoners escape through a forest and meet up with a gang of Yakuzas. When Prisoner KSC2-303 (Tak Sakaguchi) sees a girl (Chieko Misaka) that the gang kidnapped, he immediately becomes suspicious of what they plan to do with her. After a heated argument, Prisoner KSC2-303 kills one of the Yakuza members who immediately comes back to life as a zombie. The zombies are killed and Prisoner KSC2-303 escapes back into the forest with The Girl. The Yakuza decide to disobey their orders to wait for their leader and pursue Prisoner KSC2-303 and The Girl.

Prisoner KSC2-303 and The Girl come across a man crucified upon a tree. Prisoner KSC2-303 steals the dead man's clothes and is confronted by one of the Yakuza. They engage in hand-to-hand combat while the other Yakuza begin facing problems of their own. The corpses of all the men they have killed and buried in the forest resurrect and attack them. Prisoner KSC2-303 and the other Yakuza abandon their fight to battle the zombies.

With the horde of zombies growing, the Yakuza call upon three assassins to aid them in their mission. The Yakuza leader, The Man (Hideo Sakaki), finally arrives and confronts them, angry that they lost Prisoner KSC2-303 and The Girl. The Yakuza and Assassins take the upper hand and kill him first. But The Man easily jumps back to his feet and turns the Assassins and Yakuza into his own minions. Two of the Assassins escape and find Prisoner KSC2-303. One is defeated by The Girl with a log, and the other is confronted by The Man and killed.

Prisoner KSC2-303 attempts to force The Girl to tell him what is going on, believing that she has been hiding secrets from him the whole time. Before explaining thoroughly, The Man finds Prisoner KSC2-303 and The Girl. The Man begins explaining to Prisoner KSC2-303 that they are reincarnations of past lives. The Man plans to use The Girl as a sacrifice to open the portal hidden in The Forest of Resurrection and obtain the power of darkness. Unable to accept his explanations, Prisoner KSC2-303 attempts to kill The Man but is killed himself instead.

The Girl manages to reach Prisoner KSC2-303's body and feeds him a part of her blood before being taken by The Man's minions. During his unconscious state, Prisoner KSC2-303 experiences a flashback of his past life in the 10th century; he is the ally that was too late to save the lone samurai in the opening scene of the movie. He and The Girl (who is revealed to be a princess) are confronted by the mysterious priest (who turns out to be The Man) and his gang. Outnumbered and facing long odds, Pre-Prisoner KSC2-303 reluctantly kills The Girl to stop The Man from obtaining the power of darkness. Enraged, The Man viciously kills Pre-Prisoner KSC2-303. Prisoner KSC2-303 is awakened in the present with the truth fully revealed to him.

The following morning, Prisoner KSC2-303 confronts The Man and his minions for a final showdown. Prisoner KSC2-303 takes on the minions first and wins, leaving only The Man left. Prisoner KSC2-303 decapitates The Man and rescues The Girl, and both make their escape from The Forest of Resurrection.

99 years later, Earth lies in ruin. The reincarnation of The Man travels through the remains of a city, and eventually confronts Prisoner KSC2-303 and the reincarnated versions of The Man's gang (who now work for KSC2-303). The Girl, held against her will, tells The Man that she should have been on his side 99 years earlier. With nothing left to destroy in this world, Prisoner KSC2-303 asks The Man to take him to the Other Side. The Man and Prisoner KSC2-303 charge at each other and engage in battle one more time.

Cast

Production

Development
Originally, Versus was intended to be a sequel to director Kitamura's "amateur" short film Down to Hell, with the intention of also shooting Versus on video with a low budget as he did with Down to Hell but instead decided to shoot on film with budget of $10,000 for a theatrical release.

According to Kitamura, he raised the money to independently produce Versus by borrowing money from friends and family after Producers refused to produce an action film with him because, to them, it was impossible to achieve due to the lack of time and money. Filming was originally planned to last 3 weeks but was extended to 7 months due to weather and financial issues.

Casting
Tak Sakaguchi was hired for the lead after director Kitamura saw a gag video that featured Sakaguchi. Kitamura's main reason for hiring Sakaguchi was because he had "a beautiful smile;" however, Sakaguchi claims he met Kitamura during a street fight that Sakaguchi was involved in. Kitamura offered him a role in his film after asking him if he'd rather fight in the streets or fight in his films. Kitamura later vouched as well that he met Sakaguchi during a street fight.

Influences
In the film's North American DVD/Blu-ray audio commentary, Kitamura has stated that Versus pays homage to such films as The Evil Dead and Highlander, which the film has been compared to by some critics. Director Kitamura stated that Versus was inspired by the films of Sam Raimi, John Carpenter, and George Miller. Versus combines elements of multiple genres such as gunplay, martial arts action, chanbara sword fighting, zombie horror, and comedy. Director Kitamura made this creative decision because he believed Versus could have been the first and last film he'd ever produce and chose to risk everything by adding film elements that influenced him. Regarding the film's style, Kitamura stated: "It’s all me. It’s all Ryuhei Kitamura-style, and I’m not going to try to change or steer away from anything. I’m only trying to get better."

The film did not receive the title Versus until the end of shooting. During production, the film was referred to as The Return: Down 2 Hell, despite the fact that the film was not going to be released under that title. In fact, a friend of Kitamura's (who would end up working with the director as a second unit director for Godzilla: Final Wars) suggested the title Versus to reference the struggles Kitamura suffered through while trying to launch his career.

Release
Versus held its premiere at the Tokyo International Fantastic Film Festival on October 29, 2000.

Reception
Review aggregation website Rotten Tomatoes has a 73% approval based on 15 reviews with an average score of 6.5/10. The Rolling Stone called the film "A Japanese zombies-vs.-gangsters action-horror comedy that plays like Quentin Tarantino remaking THE EVIL DEAD while on a speed binge". Sight & Sound praised the film by commenting "With Kurosawa-style swordplay, martial arts and elaborately choreographed gun battles". Harry Knowles of Ain't It Cool News commented on the film "I've never seen anything like it, it's a new kind of movie." B.P. called the film "Poetic and splendid, this movie thrilled me" and MADMOVIE claimed "Hollywood made Hong Kong-style movies will never come close to his (Ryuhei Kitamura) movie."

Alternate cuts
There are three different cuts of Versus, the original cut, the R-rated cut, and the Ultimate Edition. Prior to being released commercially in the United States in 2004, DVD distributor Media Blasters produced an R-rated edited cut which removed the film's gore scenes. As a result, the R-rated cut is four minutes shorter than the original cut. Around that same time, Ultimate Versus was produced and released which featured ten minutes of new footage as well as some alterations.

Ultimate Versus
In 2004, director Kitamura and most of the original cast and crew returned to the forest to film new scenes to further realize Kitamura's vision of the film. Tak Sakaguchi directed the action sequences for the new footage due to Yûji Shimomura being unavailable at the time. The new footage was shot in five days at the same location where the original production was shot. Released in a 3-disc DVD set by Media Blasters/Tokyo Shock, a majority of the film now features some sort of reworking, be it color correction, new music, added action sequences, or full scene replacement. The result is a fuller story and character development, with additional effects. Ultimate Versus runs at 130 minutes.

Remake and sequel
In 2008, around the release of his American directorial debut Midnight Meat Train, Ryuhei Kitamura began mentioning a possible American remake of Versus.
Kitamura managed to write a full script for the American version and has stated that "The US Versus will be insane!"
On an audio commentary for the film, Kitamura has said that if a sequel would ever be made, it would pick up to where the first film ended, taking place 99 years into the future.

In a 2010 interview, Kitamura commented on the remake "This year [2010] will be tenth anniversary year of Versus so I’m thinking of doing something special. The original film means a lot to me and has huge fans all over the world, so I can’t do anything easy or cheap – I can’t guarantee anything in the long run, it’s a definite that I’ll do the new Versus in the future for sure."

In May 2013, while promoting the film No One Lives, Kitamura announced that a sequel to Versus was in development, tentatively titled Versus 2. He confirmed that he had written the script, and that Sakaguchi would likely reprise his role as KSC2-303. Kitamura expressed his intention to release the film in 2014.

References

Sources

External links

Official Film Website - In Japanese

 
 

2000 action thriller films
2000 fantasy films
2000 films
2000 horror films
2000s exploitation films
2000s Japanese films
2000s Japanese-language films
Films directed by Ryuhei Kitamura
Films set in the 10th century
Films set in 2000
Films set in the 2090s
Japanese action films
Japanese action horror films
Japanese horror films
Japanese martial arts films
Japanese splatter films
Japanese zombie films
Martial arts horror films
Tokyo Shock
Yakuza films